Distracted Snowflake Volume Two is the fifth studio album by Bugskull, released on March 23, 1999 by Scratch Records.

Track listing

Personnel 
Adapted from the Distracted Snowflake Volume Two liner notes.
Brendan Bell – organ
Sean Byrne – lead vocals, guitar
Mark Hansen – bass guitar, organ, Moog synthesizer
James Yu – drums

Release history

References 

1999 albums
Bugskull albums